Ma-Me-O Beach, Alberta, is a summer village on the southeast shore of Pigeon Lake, in Alberta, Canada.

Ma-Me-O derives from the Cree word for "pigeon",  .  It was founded in 1924.

Demographics 

In the 2016 Census of Population conducted by Statistics Canada, the Summer Village of Ma-Me-O Beach had a population of 110 living in 63 of its 259 total private dwellings, a  change from its 2011 population of 113.

Arts and culture 
During a tour of western Canada, English recording artist Joan Armatrading, who recorded for A&M Records saw the road sign for Ma-Me-O Beach and liked the name so much that she later used it as a song title. The song was included on her 1980 album Me Myself I.  Later, in 2012 Edmonton musician Christian Hansen released a song and music video which also utilized the towns name on his album C'mon Arizona.

Education
Residents of Ma-Me-O Beach are assigned to schools in the Wetaskiwin Regional Division No. 11, with Lakedell School serving primary grades and Pigeon Lake Regional School serving secondary grades.

See also 
List of communities in Alberta
List of summer villages in Alberta
List of resort villages in Saskatchewan

References

External links 

1948 establishments in Alberta
Summer villages in Alberta